Drunkboat is a 2010 American drama-genre film starring John Malkovich, Dana Delany and John Goodman. The film premiered at the 2010 Chicago International Film Festival.

Cast
 Dana Delany as Eileen
 John Malkovich as Mort
 John Goodman as Mr. Fletcher
 Jacob Zachar as Abe

Reception
The film has a 23% rating on Rotten Tomatoes. John Semley of Slant Magazine awarded the film one star out of four.

References

External links
 

2010 films
2010s English-language films
Films about alcoholism
American drama films
2010 drama films